The Smith & Wesson Model 586, is a six- or seven-shot double-action revolver chambered for the .357 Magnum cartridge; it will also chamber and fire .38 Special cartridges. The Model 586 has a carbon steel construction and is available in a blued or nickel finish; it is essentially the same firearm as the Model 686, which has stainless steel construction. It is also known as the Distinguished Combat Magnum.

Description
In addition to being able to chamber and fire .357 Magnum cartridges, the 586 will  chamber and fire .38 Special cartridges as well as .38 Special +P (overpressure ammunition). The 586 has been available with 2½ in, 3 in, 4 in, 6 in, and 8⅜ in (64, 76, 102, 153, and 214 mm) barrel lengths as standard models and other barrel lengths either by special order from S&W's Performance Center custom shop, or acquired from or built by after-market gunsmiths. The barrel has a twist rate of 1/18.75 for the 158 grain bullet.

The Model 586 uses S&W's L (medium) revolver frame, with a K-frame-sized grip mated to a larger diameter cylinder. During the 1980s, Smith & Wesson developed its L-frame line of .357 Magnums: the Smith & Wesson Model 581, Model 586, Smith & Wesson Model 681, and Model 686. The Model 581 had a fixed notch type rear sight, whereas the 586 used a target style adjustable rear sight. These handguns had a major effect on both law enforcement and sporting markets. The 586 was introduced in 1980, while the 581 was discontinued in 1988.

The K-frame guns, though popular with police departments, were felt to be too light for full-power .357 ammunition, and a heavier and more durable gun was desired, in the same frame size. (This would avoid the complaints attaching to the larger, heavier N-frame Model 29 and Model 58.) Designed with  input from official S&W historian Roy Jinks, the L-frame was the result, and it quickly gained praise from policemen and hunters.

The 586 was discontinued in 1999. After a 13-year absence, it was reintroduced in 2012 with the aforementioned safety modifications, plus an improved yoke, as the 586-8 variant. These are produced with 4- and 6-inch barrel lengths, as part of Smith & Wesson's Classic line of revolvers.

Controversy rose when Smith & Wesson cooperated with the Clinton administration to modify their line of revolvers with an internal locking mechanism and other changes. That agreement resulted in a boycott by many firearms enthusiasts, which led to a dramatic drop in stock price, and nearly bankrupted the company. Smith & Wesson was sold to Saf-T-Hammer for a fraction of its true value.

Engineering and production changes
586 (no dash), 1980 Introduction model
586-1, 1986 radius stud package, floating hand
586-M, 1987 Product warning by S&W: M over stamped to signify a modification by factory or warranty station for 586 and 586-1
586-2, 1987 changed hammer nose, bushing and associated parts
586-3, 1988 new yoke retention system
586-4, 1993 change rear sight leaf, drill and tap frame, change extractor, Hogue grips
586-5, 1997 delete 8 3/8" barrel/change to MIM thumbpiece/Ship with Master trigger locks
586-6, 1997 change frame design to eliminate cylinder stop stud, eliminate serrated tangs, MIM hammer and trigger, change to internal lock.
586-7, 2004 Performance Center .38 Super, 6-Shot unfluted cylinder, 4" barrel, Stainless Steel, 250 Made, seven shot with internal lock
586-8, 2012 Reintroduction as a Classic Series with internal lock 6-shot 4" and 6" RR, WO TS SB

Recall
In 1987, seven years after the release of the Model 686, there were reports of cylinder binding with some types of standard .357 Magnum ammunition for L-frame revolvers manufactured before August 1987. S&W published a product warning and authorized free modification to the revolver. All affected revolvers repaired for this recall were stamped with an M on the yoke near the model number. Thus it is known as the M modification for all 686, 686-1, 586, and 586-1 revolvers.

References

Smith & Wesson revolvers
Revolvers of the United States
.357 Magnum firearms
.38 Special firearms
Police weapons
Weapons and ammunition introduced in 1981